The British Grand Prix 2015 is the British Grand Prix (squash) for 2015, which is a tournament of the PSA World Tour event International (Prize money : 70 000 $). The event took place at the National Squash Centre in Manchester in England from 11 September to 14 September. Mohamed El Shorbagy won his first British Grand Prix trophy, beating Nick Matthew in the final.

Prize money and ranking points
For 2015, the prize purse was $70,000. The prize money and points breakdown is as follows:

Seeds

Draw and results

See also
2015 PSA World Tour
British Grand Prix (squash)

References

External links
PSA British Grand Prix 2015 website
British Grand Prix official website

Squash tournaments in the United Kingdom
British Grand Prix Squash
2015 in British sport
2010s in Manchester
Sports competitions in Manchester